Prince Yu of the Second Rank, or simply Prince Yu, was the title of a princely peerage used in China during the Manchu-led Qing dynasty (1636–1912). As the Prince Yu peerage was not awarded "iron-cap" status, this meant that each successive bearer of the title would normally start off with a title downgraded by one rank vis-à-vis that held by his predecessor. However, the title would generally not be downgraded to any lower than a feng'en fuguo gong except under special circumstances.

The first bearer of the title was Yunxu (允禑; 1693–1731), the 15th son of the Kangxi Emperor. In 1730, Yunxu was granted the title "Prince Yu of the Second Rank" by the Qianlong Emperor. The title was passed down over seven generations and held by seven persons.

Members of the Prince Yu peerage

 Yunxu (允禑; 1693 – 1731; 1st), the Kangxi Emperor's 15th son, initially a beile, promoted to second-rank prince under the title "Prince Yu of the Second Rank" in 1730, posthumously honoured as Prince Yu Ke of the Second Rank (愉恪郡王)
 Hongqing (弘慶; 1724 – 1769; 2nd), Yunxu's third son, held the title Prince Yu of the Second Rank from 1731 to 1769, posthumously honoured as Prince Yu Gong of the Second Rank (愉恭郡王)
 Yongjian (永珔; 1766 – 1820; 3rd), Hongqing's eldest son, held the title of a beile from 1770 to 1820
 Mianxiu (綿岫; 1782 – 1850; 4th), Yongjian's eldest son, made a defender general in 1802, held the title of a beizi from 1821 to 1850
 Yisu (奕橚; 1808 – 1866; 5th), Mianxiu's eldest son, made a second class fuguo jiangjun in 1829, held the title of a grace defender duke from 1850 to 1866
 Zaixia (載霞; 1860 – 1922), Yiqiao's eldest son and Puzhao's father, held the title of a grace general from 1875 to 1882
 Puzhao (溥釗; 1885–  1937; 7th), Zaixia's third son and Zaican's adopted son, held the title of a feng'en fuguo gong from 1885 to 1937
 Yuchun (毓純; 1905 – 1906), Puzhao's son
 Zaican (載璨; 1838 – 1885; 6th), Yisu's second son, made a bulwark duke in 1857, held the title of a grace bulwark duke from 1866 to 1885

Cadet members

Yunxu's cadet line

 Hongfu (弘富; 1727 – 1783), Yunxu's fourth son, held the title of a third class defender duke from 1749 to 1783
 Yongbo (永浡), Hongfu's third son, held the title of a bulwark general from 1784 to 1818
 Mianfen (綿鈖), Yongbo's eldest son, held the title of a grace general from 1790 to 1818, held the title of a fengguo jiangjun from 1818 to 1821
 Yiyuan (奕元), Mianfen's eldest son, held the title of a grace general from 1821 to 1851
 Zaiyu (載裕), Yiyuan's eldest son, held the title of a grace general from 1858 to 1862, stripped of his title in 1862

Hongqing's cadet line
 Yongle (永勒), Hongqing's second son, held the title of a grace general from 1790 to 1799, had no male heir

Yongjian's cadet line

 Mianjun (綿峻), Yongjian's second son, held the title of a defender duke from 1802 to 1843
 Yizhang (奕樟), Mianjun's second son, held the title of a third class bulwark general from 1843 to 1884
 Zaiwen (載雯), Yizhang's eldest son, held the title of a grace general from 1878 to 1883, had no male heir
 Mianqi (綿岐), Yongjian's fifth son, held the title of a bulwark general from 1812 to 1831
 Yiqian (奕棈), Mianqi's fourth son, held the title of a supporter general from 1831 to 1890, had no male heir
 Miankun (綿崑; 1792–1831), Yongjian's sixth son, held the title of a second class defender general from 1812 to 1831
 Yidong (奕棟; 1812–1872), Miankun's eldest son, held the title of a bulwark duke from 1832 to 1872
 Zaisou (載搜), Yidong's eldest son, held the title of a supporter general from 1857 to 1859, stripped of his title in 1859
 Zaizang (載臧), Yidong's second son, held the title of a supporter general from 1873 to 1875, had no male heir
 Yitong (奕桶), Miankun's third son, held the title of a third class bulwark general from 1844 to 1862
 Mianlun (綿崙), Yongjian's seventh son, held the title of a first class bulwark general from 1812 to 1840
 Yijie (奕傑), Mianlun's eldest son, held the title of a supporter general from 1836 to 1878
 Zaizhao (載照), Yijie's second son, held the title of a grace general from 1878
 Miangang (綿崗), Yongjian's eighth son, held the title of a first class bulwark general from 1812 to 1841
 Yifang (奕芳), Miangang's second son, held the title of a supporter general from 1841 to 1844, had no male heir
 Mianfeng (綿峯), Yongjian's ninth son, held the title of a bulwark general from 1821 to 1847
 Yibin (奕彬), Mianfeng's eldest son, held the title of a supporter general from 1847 to 1888
 Mianlong (綿巃; 1806 – 1873), Yongjian's tenth son, held the title of a bulwark general from 1826 to 1873
 Yiqiao (奕樵; 1838 – 1875), Mianlong's eldest son, held the title of a supporter general from 1873 to 1875
 Zaixia (載霞; 1860 – 1922), Yiqiao's eldest son and Puzhao's father, held the title of a grace general from 1875 to 1882
 Pusu (溥宿), Zaixia's eldest son, held the title of a grace general

Mianxiu's cadet line

 Yicheng (奕棖), Mianxiu's third son, held the title of a second class bulwark general from 1857 to 1887
 Zailin (載霖), Yicheng's eldest son, held the title of a supporter general from 1868 to 1889, had no male heir
 Zaiguang (載光), Yicheng's fourth son, held the title of a supporter general from 1877
 Pupei (溥培), Zaiguang's eldest son, held the title of a grace general from 1906
 Zaiyan (載燕), Yicheng's sixth son, held the title of a supporter general from 1877 to 1911
 Puping (溥坪), Zaiyan's eldest son, held the title of a grace general from 1906
 Yiqiu (奕楸), Mianxiu's fourth son, held the title of a second class bulwark general from 1857 to 1864, had no male heir
 Yigen (奕根), Mianxiu's sixth son, held the title of a grace general from 1857 to 1861, had no male heir
 Yi'nan (奕楠), Mianxiu's eighth son, held the title of a grace general from 1868 to 1884
 Zaizhuang (載莊), Yi'nan's second son and Yilei's adopted son, held the title of a grace general (as Yi'nan's line) from 1890 and another grace general title (as Yilei's heir) from 1902
 Yilei (奕櫑), Mianxiu's ninth son, held the title of a grace general from 1868 to 1870, had no male heir

Yisu's cadet line
 Zaixiu (載烋), Yisu's eldest son, held the title of a first class bulwark duke from 1857 to 1859, had no male heir

Family tree

See also
 Prince Hui (first rank)
 Prince Fu
 Royal and noble ranks of the Qing dynasty

References
 

Qing dynasty princely peerages